(born November 6, 1974) is a Japanese animator and illustrator living in San Francisco, California.  He is a former art director of Pixar.

Biography
He co-directed The Dam Keeper which was nominated for the Oscar for short animated film.

Filmography
Ice Age (2002) (Matte Painting/Color Stylist Art)
Robots (2005) (Lead Color Key Artist/Additional Design)
Horton Hears a Who (2008) (Lead Color Design)
Toy Story 3 (2010) (Color and Lighting Art Director)
Cars 2 (2011) (Additional Voices)
Cars 2: The Video Game (2011) (Sushi Chef)
Monsters University (2013) (Lighting Design and Character Shading Art Director)
The Dam Keeper (2014) (Co-director)
Moom (2016) (Co-director)
Oni: Thunder God's Tale (2022) (Creator/Showrunner)

Books
Dice has appeared in both volumes of Blue Sky Studios Out of Picture anthology, contributing the stories "Noche Y Dia" in Volume 1 and "The Dream of Kyosuke" in Volume 2.

The Dam Keeper has been developed volume graphic novel published by First Second Books: 

 The Dam Keeper (2017) 
 The Dam Keeper: World Without Darkness (2018)
 The Dam Keeper: Return from the Shadows (2019)

Special projects
In 2008, Dice (along with Ronnie del Carmen. Enrico Casarosa and Yukino Pang) initiated the Totoro Forest Project, a fundraising exhibition/auction to support the non-profit Totoro Forest Foundation. This initiative also produced a corresponding art book reprinting the various pieces contributed and included the likes of James Jean, Charles Vess, Iain McCaig and William Joyce among others.

He is also overseeing Sketchtravel (with Gerald Guerlais) which purpose is passing a real sketchbook "from one artist's hand to another like an Olympic torch in an artistic relay through 12 countries over 4 and half years", and the end result auctioned off to benefit the various chosen charities that the participating artists choose.

References

External links
Dice Tsutsumi homepage

1974 births
Living people
Blue Sky Studios people
Pixar people
Japanese animators
Japanese animated film directors
Japanese art directors
People from Tokyo
Japanese emigrants to the United States